Giuseppe Leone Cadenasso (1854/8February 11, 1918) was an Italian-born American oil painter who lived in San Francisco, California, where he was a member of the Bohemian Club.

Giuseppe Leone Cadenasso was born near Genoa in 1854 or 1858. He came to northern California at age 9. In San Francisco, he studied with a painter named Joseph Harrison and with Arthur Mathews at the Mark Hopkins Institute of Art (now called the San Francisco Art Institute).

He won the gold medal at the 1917 California State Fair. According to the San Francisco Examiner, "Giuseppe Cadenasso one of the coterie of old-time artists who built up the artistic fame of San Francisco, and around his name and theirs cluster many interesting stories of the pioneer, almost vagrant days of art in San Francisco." Beginning in 1902, Cadenasso headed the art department at Mills College. He died in San Francisco on February 11, 1918.

References

1850s births
1918 deaths
19th-century Italian painters
20th-century Italian painters
Artists from San Francisco
Artists of the American West
Italian expatriates in the United States
Italian male painters
19th-century Italian male artists
20th-century Italian male artists